A list of animated television series first aired in 1978.

See also
 List of animated feature films of 1978
 List of Japanese animation television series of 1978

References

Television series
Animated series
1978
1978
1978-related lists